The 2020 Campeonato da Primeira Divisão de Futebol Profissional da FGF, better known as the 2020 Campeonato Gaúcho, was the 100th season of Rio Grande do Sul's top flight football league. The season began on 22 January and was scheduled to end on 26 April. However, due to the COVID-19 outbreak, the season was paused until 22 July 2020 and ended on 30 August.

Format
The Gauchão was contested between 12 teams, who were split into two six team groups.

Taça Cel. Ewaldo Poeta

Group stage

Group A

Group B

Knockout stage

Semi-finals

Final

Taça Francisco Novelletto Neto

Group stage

Group A

Group B

Results

Playoff

Semi-finals

Final

General table

Originally, the two teams at the bottom of the general table would be relegated. Because of the COVID-19 pandemic, it was decided that no team would be relegated this season.

Goals

References

Campeonato Gaúcho seasons
Gaúcho
Campeonato Gaúcho 2020